Love Ran Red is the tenth studio album from contemporary Christian music artist Chris Tomlin. Released on October 27, 2014 through sixstepsrecords the album was preceded by two singles, "Waterfall" and "Jesus Loves Me" and was produced by Ed Cash.

Background 

Produced by Ed Cash, the album features the work of various songwriters. Matt Redman, Jonas Myrin, Ben Glover, Jason Ingram, Ben Fielding, Cash and Tomlin all contributed their abilities to the songs of the album.

Critical reception 

Signifying in a four star review for CCM Magazine, Matt Conner citing, "Love Ran Red delivers once again with strong congregational offerings that are heartfelt and memorable". Jeremy Armstrong of Worship Leader, in a three and a half star review, referencing it sounds like, " Very subtle EDM pop, Coldplay-esque emotive power and straight-to-the-heart worship production." In imparting a three and a half star review for AllMusic, Timothy Monger, recognizing, "Love Ran Red, picks up where Burning Lights left off, delivering 12 more anthemic, guitar-driven songs of praise with huge uplifting choruses and inviting hooks that should please existing fans and attract new ones." Reviewing the deluxe edition for Cross Rhythms, Chris Webb, in a seven out of ten review, observing, "Overall, 'Love Ran Red' is an accomplished album that will please many people and achieve its primary intention of providing the world Church with new material for congregational worship and the songs here are impeccably performed and produced." Alex Caldwell, in a three and a half star review for Jesus Freak Hideout, remarking, "Love Ran Red is a solid entry in Chris Tomlin's growing body of work and an album that adeptly celebrates Jesus and His sacrifice." Specifying in a four star review for New Release Tuesday, Sarah Fine writes, "Granted, while there is nothing about Love Ran Red that stands out as particularly groundbreaking, the material presented is incredibly rich and continues his ever evolving melodic experimentation... Love Ran Red will go down as yet another success in the Tomlin legacy and it is a much welcomed addition." In a two star review for Indie Vision Music, Ian Zandi criticizing, "there is not much to like about it... Skip Tomlin this year and invest in something worthwhile."

Awards and accolades 

This album was No. 7 on the Worship Leader'''s Top 20 Albums of 2014 list.

The song, "At the Cross (Love Ran Red)", was No. 14 on the Worship Leaders Top 20 Songs of 2014 list.

The album received the 2015 Dove Award nomination for Praise and Worship Album of the Year.

At the 2016 Grammy Awards, the album was nominated for Best Contemporary Christian Music Album.

 Track listing 

 Personnel 

 Chris Tomlin – lead vocals, keyboards
 Ed Cash – keyboards, programming, acoustic guitars, electric guitars, bass, backing vocals 
 Matt Gilder – keyboards
 Jason Webb – keyboards
 Scott Cash – programming
 David Garcia – programming
 Brock Human – programming
 Jason Ingram – programming, backing vocals
 Solomon Olds – programming
 Mark Suhonen – programming
 Mads Lundgaard – programming (12)
 Hank Bentley – electric guitars
 Daniel Carson – electric guitars
 Chris Lacorte – electric guitars
 Tony Lucido – bass
 Matthew Melton – bass
 Steady Duncan – drums
 Timmy Jones – drums
 Paul Mabury – drums
 Travis Nunn – drums
 Aaron Sterling – drums
 Ellie Holcomb – backing vocals, group singer
 Jonas Myrin – backing vocals 
 Patrick Anderson – group singer
 Carrollton Band – group singer
 Michael Bare – group singer
 Brian Beihl – group singer
 Kimberly Beihl – group singer
 Andrew Bergthold – group singer
 Jon Bowen – group singer
 Franni Cash – group singer
 Martin Cash – group singer
 Aaron Fairchild – group singer
 Matt Gregor – group singer
 Brittany Hodges – group singer
 Phillip LaRue – group singer
 Blake NeeSmith – group singer
 Brady Toops – group singer
 Eric Uplinger – group singer
 Mike Weaver – group singerAcoustic tracks Chris Tomlin – lead vocals
 Matt Gilder – acoustic piano, Wurlitzer electric piano
 Daniel Carson – acoustic guitars
 Stephen Leiweke – acoustic guitars, drums, percussion 
 Chris Cooke – group vocals
 Ryan Paul Hill – group vocals
 Jennifer Williams – group vocals
 Yanci – group vocalsProduction Louie Giglio – executive producer
 Shelley Giglio – executive producer, art direction, management 
 Brad O'Donnell – executive producer
 Vinnie Alibrandi – digital assembly 
 Jess Chambers – A&R administration
 Mike McCloskey – art direction, management 
 Leighton Ching – art direction, design 
 Lee Steffen – photographyTracks 1-15 Ed Cash – producer, engineer, mixing (6, 9, 11, 13, 14)
 Joe Baldridge – engineer
 Jon Bowen – assistant engineer
 Scott Cash – assistant engineer
 Ryan McAdoo – assistant engineer
 Cody Norris – assistant engineer, mix assistant (6, 9, 11, 13, 14)
 Mark Endert – mixing (1, 3, 4)
 Doug Johnson – mix assistant (1, 3, 4)
 Serban Ghenea – mixing (2, 5)
 John Hanes – mix engineer (2, 5)
 Mark Needham – mixing (7, 8, 10)
 Ben O'Neill – mix assistant (7, 8, 10)
 F. Reid Shippen – mixing (12)
 Paul "Paco" Cossette – mix assistant (12)
 Chad Cisneros – remixing and additional production (15)
 Dave Reed – remixing and additional production (15)
 Ed's, Franklin, Tennessee – recording location, mixing location (6, 9, 11, 13, 14)
 Indian River Studios, Merritt Island, Florida – mixing location (1, 3, 4)
 MixStar Studios, Virginia Beach, Virginia – mixing location (2, 5)
 The Ballroom Studio, Los Angeles, California – mixing location (7, 8, 10)
 Robot Lemon, Nashville, Tennessee – mixing location (12)
 Tom Coyne – mastering at Sterling Sound, New York City (1-12)
 Bob Boyd – mastering at Ambient Digital, Houston, Texas (13, 14, 15)Acoustic tracks' Chris Tomlin – producer 
 Stephen Leiweke – producer, recording, mixing 
 Aaron Chafin – mix assistant
 Yackland Studio (Nashville, Tennessee) – recording and mixing location 
 Bob Boyd – mastering at Ambient Digital (Houston, Texas)

 Singles 

"Waterfall" is the first single off the album and has seen top 10 success on the charts. Tomlin explains the inspiration for the song comes from two Psalms, 42:7 and 63 and the feel of the single was described as, "...your first love of God, the love of God just washing over you again..."

The second single, "Jesus Loves Me", was released on September 16, 2014 and saw top 10 success on Billboard'' Hot Christian Songs. Tomlin performed the song live for the Air1 radio station.

The third single and title track, "At the Cross (Love Ran Red)", was released on June 2, 2015.

Tour
Tomlin announced a tour to accompany the album scheduled to take place in early 2015. Tomlin was joined by fellow artists Rend Collective and Tenth Avenue North. Kicking off on February 18, 2015, the spring tour began in San Juan, Puerto Rico and saw 33 U.S cities by its end. Tomlin announced a second leg of the tour to take place in late 2015. The 21-city tour began in Nashville, Tennessee and concluded in Pittsburgh, PA, and included Rend Collective.

References 

Chris Tomlin albums
2014 albums